Nové Sady may refer to the following places:

Czech Republic
 Nové Sady (Vyškov District)
 Nové Sady (Žďár nad Sázavou District)

Other
 Nové Sady, Slovakia